Nebrioporus is a genus of beetles in the family Dytiscidae, containing the following species:

 Nebrioporus abyssinicus (Sharp, 1882)
 Nebrioporus acuminatellus (Fairmaire, 1876)
 Nebrioporus airumlus (Kolenati, 1845)
 Nebrioporus anchoralis (Sharp, 1884)
 Nebrioporus assimilis (Paykull, 1798)
 Nebrioporus baeticus (Schaum, 1864)
 Nebrioporus balli (Vazirani, 1970)
 Nebrioporus banajai (Brancucci, 1980)
 Nebrioporus benzeli (Heer, 1862)
 Nebrioporus brownei (Guignot, 1949)
 Nebrioporus bucheti (Régimbart, 1898)
 Nebrioporus canaliculatus (Lacordaire, 1835)
 Nebrioporus canariensis (Bedel, 1881)
 Nebrioporus capensis (Omer-Cooper, 1953)
 Nebrioporus carinatus (Aubé, 1838)
 Nebrioporus ceresyi (Aubé, 1838)
 Nebrioporus clarkii (Wollaston, 1862)
 Nebrioporus cooperi (Omer-Cooper, 1931)
 Nebrioporus croceus Angus, Fresneda & Fery, 1992
 Nebrioporus crotchi (Preudhomme de Borre, 1870)
 Nebrioporus depressus (Fabricius, 1775)
 Nebrioporus dubius (Aubé, 1838)
 Nebrioporus elegans (Panzer, 1794)
 Nebrioporus fabressei (Régimbart, 1901)
 Nebrioporus fenestratus (Germar, 1836)
 Nebrioporus formaster (Zaitzev, 1908)
 Nebrioporus hostilis (Sharp, 1884)
 Nebrioporus indicus (Sharp, 1882)
 Nebrioporus insignis (Klug, 1834)
 Nebrioporus islamiticus (Sharp, 1882)
 Nebrioporus kiliani (Peyerimhoff, 1929)
 Nebrioporus kilimandjarensis (Régimbart, 1906)
 Nebrioporus laeviventris (Reiche & Saulcy, 1855)
 Nebrioporus lanceolatus (Walker, 1871)
 Nebrioporus laticollis (Zimmermann, 1933)
 Nebrioporus luctuosus (Aubé, 1838)
 Nebrioporus lynesi (J.Balfour-Browne, 1947)
 Nebrioporus macronychus (Shirt & Angus, 1992)
 Nebrioporus martinii (Fairmaire, 1858)
 Nebrioporus mascatensis (Régimbart, 1897)
 Nebrioporus melanogrammus (Régimbart, 1899)
 Nebrioporus millingeni (J.Balfour-Browne, 1951)
 Nebrioporus nemethi (Guignot, 1950)
 Nebrioporus nipponicus (Takizawa, 1933)
 Nebrioporus ressli (Wewalka, 1974)
 Nebrioporus rotundatus (LeConte, 1863)
 Nebrioporus sansii (Aubé, 1838)
 Nebrioporus schoedli Fery, Fresneda & Millán, 1996
 Nebrioporus scotti (Omer-Cooper, 1931)
 Nebrioporus seriatus (Sharp, 1882)
 Nebrioporus sichuanensis Hendrich & Mazzoldi, 1995
 Nebrioporus simplicipes (Sharp, 1884)
 Nebrioporus solivagus (Omer-Cooper, 1965)
 Nebrioporus stearinus (Kolenati, 1845)
 Nebrioporus steppensis (Motschulsky, 1860)
 Nebrioporus suavis (Sharp, 1882)
 Nebrioporus sulphuricola (Zaitzev, 1951)
 Nebrioporus tellinii (Régimbart, 1904)
 Nebrioporus turca (Seidlitz, 1887)
 Nebrioporus vagrans (Omer-Cooper, 1953)
 Nebrioporus walkeri (Branden, 1885)

References

Dytiscidae genera